Young Deer Creek is a stream in Forsyth County in the U.S. state of Georgia. It is a tributary to the Chattahoochee River.

Young Deer Creek most likely is named after a local Cherokee Indian. A variant name is "Young Deers Creek".

References

Rivers of Georgia (U.S. state)
Rivers of Forsyth County, Georgia